Lubāna is a town situated in Madona Municipality in the Vidzeme region of Latvia, situated  by the Aiviekste river. It acquired a town status in 1992, and the current population is 1974. Its emblem is a golden duck on a blue background in the top part and 3 waved lines (top part silver, bottom part blue) in the bottom part.

It has a Lutheran church (built 1868-1872) and a Catholic church, 1 nursery school and 1 secondary school.

Notable people
Hugo Celmiņš, Prime Minister of Latvia.

 
Towns in Latvia
Populated places established in 1992
Madona Municipality
Kreis Wenden
Vidzeme